Greta Gertler is a pianist, singer, and songwriter.  She is originally from Sydney, Australia, and got her start there as a songwriter, penning hits for other artists. She is co-leader of orchestral pop collective, The Universal Thump, with Adam D Gold.

Early career
She self-released a solo effort, Little Sins, and toured the country with her chamber pop combo, Peccadillo. She then moved to New York City and her career developed. In 2001, she took home the grand prize in N.Y.C.'s Indie Band Search Competition for her song "Everyone Wants to Adore You." The song became the first track on Gertler's May 2003 release, The Baby That Brought Bad Weather

Debut release
Her debut solo release "The Baby That Brought Bad Weather" was described as "one of those hoped-for revelations that emerged from the never ending pile of new releases" by Vin Scelsa (WFUV) and "a sonic revelation and lyrical treat" by John Rhodes (Headliner Magazine, Radio City Music Hall). Her most recently released solo album, "Edible Restaurant" (2007), features members of Slavic Soul Party! and the song 'Veselka' (which was voted NPR Song of the Day) about the much-beloved Ukrainian diner on 9th/2nd.

Other accomplishments
In her native land, she is a multi-platinum-selling hit songwriter, having co-penned the 'classic rock' hit, "Blow Up the Pokies" (performed by The Whitlams), which was ranked 11th in a popular vote as one of the country's Top 20 Best Songs of All Time. Her song, "Charlie # 3" (also co-written with Tim Freedman and a track on the breakthrough album, "Eternal Nightcap") was performed at the Sydney Opera House by The Whitlams and the Sydney Symphony Orchestra in December 2009.

She has performed and recorded with a diverse range of artists such as Sufjan Stevens ("All Delighted People" EP), Sarah Blasko, Noe Venable, Clare & The Reasons, John Wesley Harding, Missy Higgins, Matt Kanelos, Martha Wainwright, Glenn Tilbrook (Squeeze), Glenn Patscha (Ollabelle), Joan As Policewoman, The Last Town Chorus and Madeleine Peyroux, Elysian Fields and was cited as one of NYC's Top 20 Orchestral Pop artists (the Deli Magazine).

In 2009 a successful Kickstarter campaign raised funds for The Universal Thump, an album inspired by Moby dick, performed by an "orchestral pop collective" and initially released in 4 chapters.

References

Living people
Australian pianists
Australian women pianists
Australian women singer-songwriters
Musicians from Sydney
21st-century pianists
Year of birth missing (living people)
21st-century women pianists